The 2018 Takhti Cup, were held in the Greco-Romane style in Mahshahr 25–26 January 2018;   the men's Freestyle style in Tabriz 8–9 February 2018 in Iran.  This tournament was held as 38th. It was held as the first of the ranking series of United World Wrestling, it is only men's Greco-Roman ranking.

Medal table

Team ranking

Medal overview

Freestyle

Greco-Roman

Participating nations
287 competitors from 16 nations participated.

 (11)
 (21)
 (4)
 (8)
 (3)
 (24)
 (79)
 (5)
 (25)
 (21)
 (4)
 (6)
 (11)
 (9)
 (42)
 (18)

Ranking Series
Ranking Series Calendar 2018:
 1st Ranking Series: 25–26 January, Iran, Mahshahr  ⇒ 2018 Takhti Cup (GR)
 2nd Ranking Series: 26–28 January, Russia, Krasnoyarsk ⇒ Golden Grand Prix Ivan Yarygin 2018 (FS)
 3rd Ranking Series: 15–23 February, Cuba, La Havana ⇒ 2018  Granma y Cerro Pelado (FS, WW, GR)  
 4th Ranking Series: 16–18 February, Sweden, Klippan ⇒ Klippan Lady Open (2018) (WW) 
 5th Ranking Series: 9–10 June, Mongolia, Ulaanbaatar ⇒ 2018 Mongolia Open (FS, WW)
 6th Ranking Series: 22–23 June, China, Taiyuan ⇒ 2018 China Open (WW)
 7th Ranking Series: 23–24 June, Hungary, Győr ⇒ 2018 Hungarian Grand Prix (GR)
 8th Ranking Series: 3–5 July, Georgia, Tbilisi ⇒  2018 Tbilisi Grand Prix of V. Balavadze and G. Kartozia (FS, GR)
 9th Ranking Series: 20–22 July, Turkey, Istanbul ⇒  2018 Vehbi Emre & Hamit Kaplan Tournament (GR)
 10th Ranking Series: 27–20 July, Turkey, Istanbul ⇒  2018 Yasar Dogu Tournament (FS, WW)
 11th Ranking Series: 7–9 September, Poland, Warsaw  ⇒  Ziolkowski, Pytlasinski, Poland Open (FS, WW, GR)  
 12th Ranking Series: 14–16 September, Belarus, Minsk  ⇒  Medved (Test Event Minsk 2019)

References 

Takhti Cup
Takhti Cup
February 2018 sports events in Iran
Mahshahr County
Sport in Khuzestan Province
Sports competitions in Iran
Sport in Tabriz
Wrestling in Iran
International wrestling competitions hosted by Iran